The Jalgaon rape case was a major case of human trafficking, rape, and sexual slavery that took place in Jalgaon, Maharashtra, India. It came to light in July 1994. The women, many of them school-going minors, were tricked, drugged and sometimes tortured for rape by businessmen, professionals, politicians and criminals. It is said to involve 300 to 500 women and to have been running for 5 to 12 years. It revealed a nexus of the town’s influential people who exploited the girls.

Exploitation of girls in Jalgaon had carried on unchecked for many years. The men would scout college campuses, beauty parlours, ice cream parlours, hospitals and bus terminals, for girls. A few victims claimed they were tranquillised before being sexually assaulted and photographed. They would later blackmail them.

Breaking out and police inquiry 
In 1993, however, a few girls finally lodged a police complaint. Then district superintendent of police Deepak Jog started an investigation and soon complaints began pouring in. 

The Women’s organisations staged demonstrations in various parts of the state, demanding a detailed inquiry into the cases. With rumours of the involvement of Pandit Sapkale and Raju Tadvi, Jalgaon Municipal Council (JMC) members belonging to Indian National Congress party, the issue was hotly debated in the state assembly too. 
 
Following the uproar, a special investigation team was stationed at Jalgaon. Headed by Arvind Inamdar, Meera Borwankar and Deepak Jog, it got cracking at the case. Subsequently, a chargesheet was filed and a special court of Sessions Judge Mridula Bhatkar was set up in Pune to conduct the trial. Recording of evidence began in 1995. 

About 20 cases of sexual exploitation, including 12 rapes, were registered in Jalgaon and neighbouring Bhusaval. Some of the victims were just 12-year-olds, and all came from poor families.

Accused 
Prominent among the accused were two  shivsena leaders and members of the Jalgaon Municipal Council, a doctor, a lawyer, an employee of a radio broadcasting station and a lodge owner. 
The prominent local congress leader Suresh Jain (Sureshdada) was also mentioned in the media to be involved however he denied his involvement in case.

Court case 
Meera Borwankar, who later became joint commissioner (crime) in Mumbai: ‘‘The main problem was that the offences were reported late. By the time FIRs were registered, a year had gone by. So, the medical evidence was absent. Even at the time of filing the chargesheet, we knew the cases were weak ones but still we took a conscientious decision to make it to the courts.’’ 

While investigators had recorded statements of witnesses, and had recovered the ‘‘objectionable’’ photographs of victims taken allegedly by the accused, several witnesses turned hostile.  In 1997, the special court gave sentences in five of the 20 cases.

Acquittal and protest 
However, in 2000, the Bombay High Court acquitted the prime accused and congress leader Pandit Omkar Sakpale, after he completed four years in jail, on the grounds that evidence against him did not appear to be "natural and believable".

Thousands of women took part in a silent morcha to the Jalgaon collectorate in protest against the acquittal of Pandit Sapkale, the prime accused . Leaders of the morcha later handed over a memorandum to the District Collector, asking that congress leader Sapkale not be allowed to enter Jalgaon. They also burned an effigy of the accused. The then Deputy Chief Minister of Maharashtra, Mr Gopinath Munde, had said that the state government would challenge the verdict in the Supreme Court of India.

See also 
 Suryanelli rape case
 Ajmer rape case

External links 
 

History of Maharashtra (1947–present)
1994 in India
Rape in India
Crime in Maharashtra
Jalgaon
Incidents of violence against girls